Uncial 0200 (in the Gregory-Aland numbering), is a Greek-Coptic diglot uncial manuscript of the New Testament, on parchment. Palaeographically it has been assigned to the 7th century. The manuscript has survived in a very fragmentary condition.

Description 

The codex contains a small parts of the Gospel of Matthew 11:20-21, on one parchment leaf. The text is written in two columns per page, 17 lines per page, in very large uncial letters. 

The Greek text of this codex is mixed. Aland placed it in Category III.

Currently it is dated by the INTF to the 7th century.

It was examined and described by H. J. M. Milne.

The codex currently is housed at the British Library (Pap. 2077 C) in London.

See also 

 List of New Testament uncials
 Coptic versions of the Bible
 Textual criticism
 Uncial 0199

References

Further reading 

 H. J. M. Milne, Catalogue of the Literary Papyri in the British Museum (London, 1927).

Greek New Testament uncials
7th-century biblical manuscripts
Greek-Coptic diglot manuscripts of the New Testament
British Library collections